Hugh St Clair Cunningham (born 1942) is a historian and retired academic. A specialist in the history of childhood, nationalism, philanthropy and leisure, he is an emeritus professor of social history at the University of Kent.

Career 
Born in 1942, Cunningham completed a Bachelor of Arts degree at the University of Cambridge, graduating in 1963. He was then a lecturer at the University of Sierra Leone from 1963 to 1966. He returned to studying, completing a doctorate at the University of Sussex; his DPhil was awarded in 1969 for his thesis "British Public Opinion and the Eastern Question 1877–1878".

In 1969, Cunningham became a lecturer at the University of Kent, where he was promoted to a senior lecturership in 1984 and then to be professor of social history in 1991. He was still on the faculty at the end of the 2001–2002 year, but had retired by March 2004. He was appointed an emeritus professor on retirement. In a staff profile, he listed his specialisms as: the "history of childhood; leisure; popular nationalism; British history 1832–1918". More recently, he has studied charity and philanthropy.

Bibliography 
Books

Peer-reviewed articles and chapters

References 

1942 births
English historians
Alumni of the University of Cambridge
Academics of the University of Kent
Living people